Chloe Rose Lattanzi (born January 17, 1986) is an American singer and actress.

Biography

Personal life 
Lattanzi was born on January 17, 1986, at Cedars-Sinai Medical Center in Los Angeles, California. She is the daughter of the late singer and actress Olivia Newton-John and actor Matt Lattanzi. Her parents divorced amicably in 1995. One of her maternal great-grandfathers was Nobel prize–winning physicist Max Born.

Since turning 18, Lattanzi has undergone numerous plastic surgery procedures, reportedly to a value in excess of $500,000. In 2013, she was treated for alcohol and cocaine addiction. In 2017, she moved with her fiancé, Martial Arts Trainer James Driskill to Portland Oregon, where they bought a farm and started a marijuana business.

Musical career
In 2002, Lattanzi portrayed Chrissy in a Melbourne stage production of the 1960s musical Hair.

Lattanzi is the writer of "Can I Trust Your Arms", which appeared on her mother's 2005 hallmark album Stronger Than Before.

In 2008, Lattanzi appeared on the reality show Rock the Cradle, finishing in third place, following Jesse Blaze Snider and Crosby Loggins.

In October 2010, Lattanzi's debut single "Wings and a Gun" was released digitally in Japan.

Discography

Albums

Singles

Filmography
 Paradise Beach (1993) (cameo in last episode of Australian television soap)
 A Christmas Romance (1994) (TV movie)
 Mannheim Steamroller's Christmas Angel (1998) (TV show)
 The Enchanted Billabong (1999) (voice in Australian animated feature)
 Bette (2001) (episode: "The Invisible Mom")
 The Wilde Girls (2001) (TV movie)
 Dead 7 (2016)
 Sharknado 5: Global Swarming (2017) (TV movie)
 Dancing with the Stars Australia (2020) (contestant)

See also
 List of artists who reached number one on the U.S. Dance Club Songs chart

References

External links
 
 

1986 births
Living people
Actresses from Los Angeles
American child actresses
American dance musicians
American people of German-Jewish descent
American people of Italian descent
American people of Polish descent
American people of Welsh descent
Musicians from Los Angeles
Singing talent show contestants
21st-century American women